Quduqian (Chinese: 屈都乾; pinyin: Qūdūqián) was the Chinese designation for an ancient kingdom, chiefdom, or a polity that perhaps located around Binh Dinh province, Central Vietnam, then became part of Champa Kingdoms. 

According to the Book of Jin, Quduqian situated 600 li or 186 miles/300 kilometers south of Boliao (波遼國, Tam Kỳ). Quduqian sent an embassy to the Jin court in Luoyang in 286 AD.

See also
 History of Champa
 Other early states in Central Vietnam
 Lâm Ấp
 Xitu
 Boliao

References

Sources
  
 

Champa
Ancient Vietnam
History of Champa
Former countries in Vietnamese history
Former countries in Southeast Asia